Tarlochan Singh Kler is an Indian interventional cardiologist, medical administrator, writer, Chairman at Fortis Heart and Vascular Institute, (Fortis Memorial Research Institute,Gurugram and Fortis Flt. Lt. Rajan Dhall Hospital) and (former Director of Cardiac Sciences at Fortis Escorts Heart Institute). Born in Amargarh in the Indian state of Punjab, he graduated in medicine from Punjabi University in 1976, secured his MD in general medicine from Postgraduate Institute of Medical Education and Research (PGIMER) in 1980 and followed it up with the degree of DM in cardiology from the same institution in 1983. He succeeded Naresh Trehan as the executive director of Fortis Heart Institute and Research Centre before becoming its director. He has written several articles on interventional cardiology; Persistent left superior vena cava opening directly into right atrium and mistaken for coronary sinus during biventricular pacemaker implantation, Mammary coronary artery anastomosis without cardiopulmonary bypass through minithoracotomy: one year clinical experience, and Ventricular Fibrillation in the EP Lab. What is the Atrial Rhythm? are some of the notable ones. The Government of India awarded him the third highest civilian honour of the Padma Bhushan, in 2005, for his contributions to medicine.

See also 

 Naresh Trehan

References 

Recipients of the Padma Bhushan in medicine
Medical doctors from Punjab, India
Indian cardiologists
Interventional cardiology
Indian medical writers
Indian medical administrators
Punjabi University alumni
Year of birth missing (living people)
Living people
20th-century Indian medical doctors